Francis Gore, (1769 – 3 November 1852) was an English military officer and British colonial administrator in Bermuda and Upper Canada.

Gore was born in Blackheath, London, England in 1769 the son of Francis Gore and Caroline Beresford. Francis Gore senior was also a soldier and colonial administrator. Gore Sr became a governor of the West Indies in 1763. He had served in the Portuguese campaign of 1761 as aide-de-camp to Queen Charlotte's brother.

Gore was commissioned as an ensign into the 44th Foot in 1787 directly from school at Durham, advancing in 1793 to lieutenant. Gore transferred to the 54th Foot in 1794 and the 17th Light Dragoons in 1795. He retired with the rank of major and became Governor of Bermuda from 1805 to 1806, and then Lieutenant-Governor of Upper Canada from 1806 to 1811. Gore's administration built roads, reorganised the militia and founded schools.

Gore was absent on leave during the War of 1812 while military authorities ran Upper Canada. His stand-in during this time was Isaac Brock, who "sought an active role in the impending war as keenly as Gore sought to escape it".

Gore resumed his role as lieutenant-governor from 1815 to 1817. During his second term, Gore prorogued the Legislative Assembly after it challenged his ban on issuing land grants to American refugees and made other criticisms of his administration. Robert MacIntosh, in his book Earliest Toronto, describes Gore as "a man who was clearly the most incompetent and disliked Lieutenant Governor in the history of Upper Canada". Gore left Canada after his posting in 1817.

Gore married Annabella Wentworth, sister of Sir John Wentworth in 1803. They had no children. Gore died in Brighton, England, on 3 November 1852.

Legacy
Gore Vale, a north–south street on the eastern boundary of Trinity Bellwoods Park on the west side of downtown Toronto, is named after him. The lands of the park were at one time owned by Gore, who gave the ravine the name of "Gore Vale". Most historians believe that the township municipality of Gore, Quebec, was named after him. Meyer's Creek was renamed Belleville by United Empire Loyalist settlers in honour of his wife Lady Annabella Gore in 1816, after their visit to the settlement.

References

External links 

1769 births
1852 deaths
54th Regiment of Foot officers
17th Lancers officers
Lieutenant-Governors of Upper Canada
People from Blackheath, London
Governors of Bermuda
44th Regiment of Foot officers